ESCC may refer to:

 East Suburban Catholic Conference, a schools sports body in Chicago
 East Sussex County Council, England 
 Eastern Suburbs Cricket Club, near Sydney 
 English Sewing Cotton Company, a successor of Bagley & Wright 
 Esophageal squamous cell carcinoma, a cause of esophageal cancer